Hélder Filipe Oliveira Lopes (born 4 January 1989) is a Portuguese professional footballer who plays for Israeli club Hapoel Be'er Sheva as a left-back.

Club career

Parma and Portugal
Born in Vila Nova de Gaia, Porto District, Lopes spent his youth career at SC Coimbrões, Padroense F.C. and CD Candal, graduating from the latter in 2008. In that summer he moved abroad, joining Parma F.C. but failing to make a single appearance for the club.

Returning to his homeland in January 2009, Lopes made his senior debut with SC Mirandela by starting in a 1–1 Segunda Divisão home draw against SC Maria da Fonte. He subsequently represented C.F. Oliveira do Douro, S.C. Espinho and C.D. Tondela, all in the lower leagues; with the latter team, he achieved promotion to the Segunda Liga.

Lopes signed a two-year deal with Primeira Liga side S.C. Beira-Mar on 5 July 2012. He made his professional debut on 30 September, coming on as a second-half substitute for Rúben Ribeiro in a 1–1 home draw with Vitória de Setúbal.

On 28 June 2013, Lopes was transferred to F.C. Paços de Ferreira also in the top tier. He scored his first goal as a professional on 3 January 2015, in a 1–2 home loss to Rio Ave FC.

Las Palmas
On 31 May 2016, Lopes agreed to a two-year contract with La Liga club UD Las Palmas. His competitive debut took place on 1 October, as he started and played 69 minutes in a 2–2 draw at CA Osasuna.

AEK Athens
On 21 June 2017, free agent Lopes signed a two-year deal at AEK Athens FC. He made his official debut on 2 August, in a 1–0 away defeat against PFC CSKA Moscow in the second leg of the UEFA Champions League third qualifying round.

Lopes scored his first goal for the team on 6 January 2018, in a 4–1 victory over against Panetolikos F.C. after an assist from Masoud Shojaei. He appeared in 31 matches in all competitions in his first season, helping the club win its first Super League Greece since 1994.

On 29 September 2018, in an away fixture against OFI Crete FC, Lopes suffered an anterior cruciate ligament injury. On 8 January 2019, he agreed to a contract extension until the summer of 2022.

Hapoel Be'er Sheva
In August 2021, Lopes joined Hapoel Be'er Sheva F.C. of the Israeli Premier League.

Personal life
Lopes' twin brother, Tiago, was also a footballer and a defender.

Career statistics

Honours
AEK Athens
Super League Greece: 2017–18

Hapoel Be'er Sheva
Israel State Cup: 2021–22
Israel Super Cup: 2022

References

External links

1989 births
Living people
Portuguese twins
Twin sportspeople
Sportspeople from Vila Nova de Gaia
Portuguese footballers
Association football defenders
Padroense F.C. players
SC Mirandela players
S.C. Espinho players
C.D. Tondela players
S.C. Beira-Mar players
F.C. Paços de Ferreira players
Parma Calcio 1913 players
La Liga players
UD Las Palmas players
AEK Athens F.C. players
Hapoel Be'er Sheva F.C. players
Primeira Liga players
Segunda Divisão players
Super League Greece players
Israeli Premier League players
Portuguese expatriate footballers
Expatriate footballers in Italy
Expatriate footballers in Spain
Expatriate footballers in Greece
Expatriate footballers in Israel
Portuguese expatriate sportspeople in Italy
Portuguese expatriate sportspeople in Spain
Portuguese expatriate sportspeople in Greece
Portuguese expatriate sportspeople in Israel